Gowharan Rural District may refer to:
 Gowharan Rural District (Hormozgan Province)
 Gowharan Rural District (Khoy County), West Azerbaijan province